A 1951 USAF resolution test chart is a microscopic optical resolution test device originally defined by the U.S. Air Force MIL-STD-150A standard of 1951. The design provides numerous small target shapes exhibiting a stepped assortment of precise spatial frequency specimens.  It is widely used in optical engineering laboratory work to analyze and validate imaging systems such as microscopes, cameras and image scanners.

The full standard pattern consists of 9 groups, with each group consisting of 6 elements; thus there are 54 target elements provided in the full series.  Each element consists of three bars which form a minimal Ronchi ruling. These 54 elements are provided in a standardized series of logarithmic steps in the spatial frequency range from 0.250 to 912.3 line pairs per millimeter (lp/mm).  The series of elements spans the range of resolution of the unaided eye, down to the diffraction limits of conventional light microscopy.

Commercially produced devices typically consist of a transparent square glass slide, 2 inches or 50 mm in dimension.  The slide is printed in metallic chromium by photolithography with the standard pattern, photographically reduced from a large master plot. Slides are available as photographic positive or negative prints to best fit the illumination technique used in various testing methods.  A less expensive, abbreviated version omits the two tiniest groups at the center of the pattern (groups number 8 and 9), since the lithography at that scale is costly, and the group elements represent resolution beyond the design of many imaging applications.

In practice, the spatial resolution of an imaging system is measured by simply inspecting the system's image of the slide.  The largest element observed without distinct image contrast indicates the approximate resolution limit.  This element's label is noted by the observer (each group, and each element within a group, is labeled with a single digit).  This pair of digits indicates a given element's row and column location in the series table, which in turn defines the spatial frequency of each element, and thus the available resolution of the system.

An analytical characterization of resolution as the modulation transfer function is available by plotting the observed image contrast as a function of the various element spatial frequencies.  Optical aberrations in the imaging system are readily detected and characterized by translating and rotating the elements within the imaging system's field of view.

Pattern format

The common MIL-STD-150A format consists of six groups in a compact spiral arrangement of three layers. The largest two groups, forming the first layer, are located on the outer sides. The smaller layers consist of repeating progressively smaller pairs toward the center. Each group consists of six elements, numbered from 1 to 6. Within the same layer, the odd-numbered groups appear contiguously from 1 through 6 from the upper right corner. The first element of the even-numbered groups is at the lower right of the layer, with the remaining 2 through 6, at the left. The scales and dimensions of the bars are given by the expression

 

although usually the following lookup table will be more convenient to use. The line pair (lp) means a black and a white line.

Images

See also
USAF 1951 target section, in Optical resolution

References

External links
 efg's Tech Note: USAF 1951 and Microcopy Resolution Test Charts.
 A USAF 1951 resolution chart in PDF format is provided by Yoshihiko Takinami. This chart should be printed such that the side of the square of the 1st element of the group -2 should be 10 mm long.
 USAF 1951 Resolution Target Further explanations and examples
 Koren 2003: Norman Koren's updated resolution chart better suited for computer analysis

Imaging
1951 establishments in the United States
Usaf Resolution Test Chart, 1951
20th-century history of the United States Air Force